Rosny-sous-Bois is a commune in the eastern suburbs of Paris, France.

It is the seat of the national centre of road information of the national gendarmerie.

Population

Heraldry

Transport
Rosny-sous-Bois is served by two stations on Paris RER line E: Rosny – Bois-Perrier and Rosny-sous-Bois.

Education
The commune has seven public primary school groups, with each having a preschool (maternelle) and an elementary school. There is also a private Montessori French-English bilingual primary school, Ecole maternelle privée «Les merveilles».

Secondary schools:
 Junior high schools: Albert Camus, Langevin-Wallon, Saint Exupery
 Senior high schools/sixth-form colleges: Lycée Charles de Gaulle and Lycée Professionnel Jean Moulin

Personalities
Selim Bouadla—footballer
Mamadou Diakité—footballer
Nicolas Douchez—footballer
Philippe Carlos—senior category manager
Soufiane Guerrab—actor

See also
Communes of the Seine-Saint-Denis department

References

External links

Official website (in French)
Rosny-Rail: Railroad Museum of Rosny-sous-Bois (in English)

Communes of Seine-Saint-Denis